Nový Rychnov is a market town in Pelhřimov District in the Vysočina Region of the Czech Republic. It has about 1,000 inhabitants.

Administrative parts
Villages of Čejkov, Chaloupky, Křemešník, Řeženčice, Sázava and Trsov are administrative parts of Nový Rychnov.

Geography
It lies in the Křemešník Highlands.

References

Populated places in Pelhřimov District
Market towns in the Czech Republic